The 2003 Northern Illinois Huskies football team represented Northern Illinois University as a member of the West Division of the Mid-American Conference (MAC) during the 2003 NCAA Division I-A football season. Led by eighth-year head coach Joe Novak, the Huskies compiled an overall record of 10–2 with a mark of 6–2 in conference play, placing second in the MAC's West Division. Despite reaching bowl eligibility, the Northern Illinois was not invited to a bowl game. The team played home games at Huskie Stadium in DeKalb, Illinois.

Schedule

References

Northern Illinois
Northern Illinois Huskies football seasons
Northern Illinois Huskies football